Seli is a village in Lääneranna Parish, Pärnu County in Estonia.
Seli is well known for its industrial hotdog factory.

References

Villages in Pärnu County